was a Japanese vocalist who primarily sang anison, or anime theme songs. He released , a compilation of his works. He also provided vocals to a song on the soundtrack to the 1977 film House.

Narita died from pneumonia on November 13, 2018, at the age of 73.

References

External links
EVERGREEN - Ken Narita's official website 

Japanese male singers
1945 births
2018 deaths
Musicians from Dalian
Musicians from Hokkaido
Anime musicians